Microsoft v. Lindows.com, Inc. was a court case brought by Microsoft against Lindows, Inc in December 2001, claiming that the name "Lindows" was a violation of its trademark "Windows."

After two and a half years of court battles, Microsoft paid  million for the Lindows trademark, and Lindows Inc. became Linspire Inc.

The case
In addition to the United States, Microsoft also sued Lindows in Sweden, France, Belgium, Luxembourg, the Netherlands and Canada.

Lindows started off with a handicap of having to defend themselves from their own lawyers (from St. Paul Fire and Marine Insurance Company) who initially refused to defend Lindows.  Judge Robert Takasugi found St. Paul Fire and Marine Insurance Company had breached their contract.

All money from the memberships went towards helping Lindows in its legal battle against Microsoft.

Lindows had also retaliated against Microsoft's lawsuits with Lin---s (pronounced Lindash) and the corresponding domain lin---s.com (now disused).  Consumers and resellers from countries in which Microsoft had blocked the sale of Lindows products due to the trademark lawsuits were encouraged to visit the Lin---s website instead of Lindows.com to purchase the Lin---s software, which was identical to Lindows except for the name change.

As early as 2002, a court rejected Microsoft's claims, stating that Microsoft had used the term "windows" to describe graphical user interfaces before the product, Windows, was ever released, and the windowing technique had already been implemented by Xerox and Apple many years before. Microsoft kept seeking retrial, but in February 2004, a judge rejected two of Microsoft's central claims. The judge denied Microsoft's request for a preliminary injunction and raised "serious questions" about Microsoft's trademark.  Microsoft feared a court may define "Windows" as generic and result in the loss of its status as a trademark.

Settlement
In July 2004, Microsoft offered to settle with Lindows. As part of this licensing settlement, Microsoft paid an estimated , and Lindows transferred the Lindows trademark to Microsoft and changed their name to Linspire.

See also
 Microsoft litigation
 X Window System

References

External links
 Microsoft Legal News
 Windows v. Lindows: High-Tech Trademark Troubles
 Microsoft's press release announcing the settlement

United States computer case law
United States trademark case law
Microsoft litigation
Linspire
2001 in United States case law